Sina Ashouri (born September 16, 1988) is a retired Iranian footballer who last played for Tractor and Zob Ahan among other clubs in Persian Gulf Pro League. ۱۲۳

Club career
Ashouri has been with Zob Ahan since 2006 in their youth system and in 2008 he was promoted to the first team. Before the 2015–16 Ashouri was loaned out to Tractor to spend his military conscription there. After the end of the loan in summer 2016, Ashouri permanently moved to Tractor until 26 January 2018.

Club Career Statistics
Last Update  7 March 2016 

 Assist Goals

Honors

Club 
 Zob Ahan
 AFC Champions League : 2010 Runner up
 Persian Gulf Pro League : 2008-09 Runner up, 2009-10 Runner up
 Hazfi Cup (2) : 2008-09 , 2014-15
 Tractor
 Hazfi Cup : 2016-17 Runner up
Shohada Cup (1): 2017

References
3. محکومیت میلیاردی تراکتور در پرونده عشوری + عکس  Retrieved in Persian www.farsnews.ir

4. غرامت یک میلیارد تومانی تراکتور به سینا Retrieved in Persian www.varzesh3.com

5. سینا عشوری قراردادش را با تراکتورسازی تمدید کرد + عکس Retrieved in Persian www.tasnimnews.com

6. سینا عشوری از فوتبال خداحافظی کرد Retrieved in Persian www.ilna.news

7. Seongnam vs. Zob Ahan Retrieved Soccerway 13 November 2010

8. شکست ذوب‌آهن از حریف کره‌ای در فینال لیگ قهرمانان آسیا Retrieved in Persian www.radiofarda.com

External links 
 Sina Ashouri at PersianLeague.com
 
 
 

1988 births
Living people
Zob Ahan Esfahan F.C. players
Iranian footballers
Footballers at the 2010 Asian Games
Persian Gulf Pro League players
Qashqai people
Tractor S.C. players
Association football midfielders
Asian Games competitors for Iran